Đuro Salaj (1889 – 20 May 1958) was one of the founders of the Communist Party of Yugoslavia and the first president of the United Labour Unions of Yugoslavia.

Salaj was born in Valpovo and received secondary education as a tailor. In 1907 he travelled to Austria, Germany and Switzerland looking for work, and became a social democrat and a trade union activist. In 1909 he moved to Sarajevo and became a local sewing trade union representative. After World War I he moved to Slavonski Brod where he became further involved in politics, and led the local branch of the Social Democratic Party to become the Communist Party.

Between 1930 and 1944 he was the Communist Party of Yugoslavia representative with the Comintern, stationed in the Soviet Union.

In SFR Yugoslavia, he was decorated with the Order of the Hero of Socialist Labour.

His remains are buried in the Tomb of the People's Heroes, Zagreb.

Sources
 Salaj, Đuro 

1889 births
1958 deaths
People from Valpovo
People from the Kingdom of Croatia-Slavonia
League of Communists of Croatia politicians
Burials at Mirogoj Cemetery
Recipients of the Order of the Hero of Socialist Labour